In mathematics, Grothendieck's six operations, named after Alexander Grothendieck, is a formalism in homological algebra, also known as the six-functor formalism. It originally sprang from the relations in étale cohomology that arise from a morphism of schemes .  The basic insight was that many of the elementary facts relating cohomology on X and Y were formal consequences of a small number of axioms.  These axioms hold in many cases completely unrelated to the original context, and therefore the formal consequences also hold.  The six operations formalism has since been shown to apply to contexts such as D-modules on algebraic varieties, sheaves on locally compact topological spaces, and motives.

The operations 
The operations are six functors.  Usually these are functors between derived categories and so are actually left and right derived functors.

 the direct image 
 the inverse image 
 the proper (or extraordinary) direct image 
 the proper (or extraordinary) inverse image 
 internal tensor product
 internal Hom

Similarly, internal tensor product is left adjoint to internal Hom.

Six operations in étale cohomology 

Let  be a morphism of schemes. The morphism f induces several functors. Specifically, it gives adjoint functors f* and f* between the categories of sheaves on X and Y, and it gives the functor f! of direct image with proper support. In the derived category, Rf! admits a right adjoint f!. Finally, when working with abelian sheaves, there is a tensor product functor ⊗ and an internal Hom functor, and these are adjoint.

Furthermore, suppose that f is separated and of finite type. If  is another morphism of schemes, if  denotes the base change of X by g, and if f′ and g′ denote the base changes of f and g by g and f, respectively, then there exist natural isomorphisms:

Again assuming that f is separated and of finite type, for any objects M in the derived category of X and N in the derived category of Y, there exist natural isomorphisms:

If i is a closed immersion of Z into S with complementary open immersion j, then there is a distinguished triangle in the derived category:

where the first two maps are the counit and unit, respectively of the adjunctions.  If Z and S are regular, then there is an isomorphism:

Then, for objects M and M′ in the derived category on X, the canonical maps:

are isomorphisms.  Finally, if  is a morphism of S-schemes, and if M and N are objects in the derived categories of X and Y, then there are natural isomorphisms:

See also 
Coherent duality
Grothendieck local duality
Image functors for sheaves
Verdier duality
Change of rings

References

External links 

What (if anything) unifies stable homotopy theory and Grothendieck's six functors formalism?

Sheaf theory
Homological algebra
Duality theories